The 1965 World 600, the 6th running of the event, was a NASCAR Grand National Series race held on May 23, 1965 at Charlotte Motor Speedway in Charlotte, North Carolina. Contested over 400 laps on the 1.5 mile (2.4 km) speedway, it was the 19th race of the 1965 NASCAR Grand National Series season. Fred Lorenzen of Holman-Moody won the race.

Background
Charlotte Motor Speedway is a motorsports complex located in Concord, North Carolina, United States, 13 miles from Charlotte, North Carolina. The complex features a 1.5 mile (2.4 km) quad oval track that hosts NASCAR racing including the prestigious World 600 on Memorial Day weekend and the National 400. The speedway was built in 1959 by Bruton Smith and is considered the home track for NASCAR with many race teams located in the Charlotte area. The track is owned and operated by Speedway Motorsports Inc. (SMI).

Race report

Dick Hutcherson managed to take the championship lead away from Ned Jarrett after this race. 

Future international star Pedro Rodriguez finished fifth here in a factory Ford in a rare Grand National appearance. Marvin Panch crashed the Wood Brothers' Ford vehicle and finished in 33rd place. This was close to the time that they pitted the winning car of Jimmy Clark at the 1965 Indianapolis 500.

Notable crew chiefs at this race; Ray Fox, John Ervin, Jimmy Thomas and Herb Nab.

Final Results

References

World 600
World 600
NASCAR races at Charlotte Motor Speedway